John Cotton's Birds of the Port Phillip District of New South Wales 1843-1849 is a book published by William Collins (Australia), in a limited edition of 850 copies.  It catalogues the ornithological artwork of 19th century Australian settler John Cotton, along with biographical information about him, reproductions of selected sketches and paintings, and extracts from his journals.  The 'Port Phillip District of New South Wales' in the book's title roughly corresponds geographically to the Australian state of Victoria which was only formed in 1851, shortly after Cotton's death.

The book is 230 mm high by 324 mm wide and was issued in a slipcase.  It was authored by Allan McEvey and contains a foreword by Alec H. Chisholm, as well as a biographical introduction by Cotton's great-granddaughter, Maie Casey, who also sponsored the production of the book.

The book is a tribute to Cotton and his ornithological and artistic talents.  After migrating from England to Australia and establishing himself and his family on a sheep station on the Goulburn River, he began to study, collect and sketch the birds there.  However, his plans to produce a book on Victorian birds ultimately came to nothing through historical circumstance and his own early death three days before his 48th birthday, with his journals and artwork unpublished, scattered among his descendants and lost to the world for over 120 years.

Of Cotton's talents as an artist, McEvey says:

The book was reviewed in the journal Emu by Roy Wheeler (as W.R.W.), who said:

References

Notes

Sources
 
 

1974 books
Books about Australian birds